Hester Shaw, later known as Hester Natsworthy, is the lead heroine of Philip Reeve's Mortal Engines Quartet.

Background and life
Hester Shaw, aged around fifteen at the beginning of the Quartet, is the daughter of Thaddeus Valentine and Pandora Shaw. She was raised by Shrike.

Hester is portrayed as having copper hair and gray eyes. She has a scar which cut her face from forehead to jaw, a wrenched mouth, a stump nose, and a single eye.

The character's surname comes from Shaugh Prior.

Role
In the first novel of the Mortal Engines Quartet (known in the US as The Hungry City Chronicles), Mortal Engines, her botched assassination attempt on Thaddeus Valentine led to Tom Natsworthy and set off a chain of events that would change the course of history. She is a key character in each book in the Quartet, often in the center of conflicts that occur. She is the mother of Wren Natsworthy.

In other media
In the Mortal Engines student short film made in 2009, Alyssa Burnett plays Hester. One of her photos are mistakenly identified as a cosplay.

There is a 28mm figure based on Hester Shaw.

In Mortal Engines, the film adaptation of the first book, Hester is portrayed by twenty-eight-year-old Icelandic actress Hera Hilmar as an adult, while the young Hester is played by New Zealand child actress Poppy Macleod. Her scar is heavily toned down, and she is aged to her twenties. Hilmar described her character as challenging to play. Christian Rivers, the director of the film, addressed the fan criticism over Hester's scar, stating that audiences would be "put off the film" if it were more true to the books. The author acknowledged the difference. Reviewers from FilmBook, ScreenRant, and USA Today remarked that this rendition of Hester lacks character development. Other changes include: she lost her mother when she was eight and she fought Valentine aboard his airship. This was Hilmar's last international film role before the COVID-19 pandemic.

See also

References

Mortal Engines
Characters in British novels of the 21st century
Child characters in film
Female characters in film
Female characters in literature
Fictional characters with disfigurements
Fictional suicides
Literary characters introduced in 2001
Orphan characters in literature
Predator Cities
Teenage characters in literature